Chorizopesoides is a genus of orb-weaver spiders first described by X. Q. Mi & C. Wang in 2018.  it contains only two species.

References

External links

Araneidae
Araneomorphae genera